The 1947 Tasmanian Australian National Football League (TANFL) premiership season was an Australian Rules football competition staged in Hobart, Tasmania over fifteen (15) roster rounds and four (4) finals series matches between 19 April and 27 September 1947.

The TANFL introduced two new teams into the district-based competition, New Norfolk (founded in 1878) and Clarence (founded in 1884) were both introduced from the Southern District Football Association for a two-year trial period.

There was also a two-week break in mid-season to allow for the 1947 Australian National Football Championships to be played, all Carnival matches were staged at North Hobart Oval.

Participating clubs
Clarence District Football Club
New Town District Football Club
Hobart Football Club
New Norfolk District Football Club
North Hobart Football Club
Sandy Bay Football Club

1947 TANFL Club Coaches
Bert McTaggart (Clarence)
Brian Kelly (New Town)
Jack Sullivan (Hobart)
Albert "Tich" Edwards (New Norfolk)
Jack Metherell (North Hobart)
Lance Collins (Sandy Bay)

TANFL Reserves Grand Final
Nth Hobart 9.6 (60) v Sandy Bay 6.13 (49) – North Hobart Oval

TANFL Under-19's Grand Final
State Schools Old Boys Football Association (SSOBFA)
 Buckingham 8.10 (58) v South East 6.7 (43) – New Town Oval
Note: Buckingham were affiliated to New Town, South East were affiliated to Sandy Bay.

State Grand Final
(Saturday, 4 October 1947)
Nth Launceston: 7.7 (49) | 9.8 (62) | 14.11 (95) | 19.16 (130)
Nth Hobart: 0.1 (1) | 6.3 (39) | 7.4 (46) | 10.9 (69)
Attendance: 7,500 at York Park

Intrastate Matches
Jubilee Shield (Saturday, 10 May 1947)
TANFL 18.14 (122) v NWFU 16.15 (111) – Att: 10,000 at North Hobart Oval

Jubilee Shield (Saturday, 7 June 1947)
TANFL 13.14 (92) v NWFU 9.13 (67) – Att: 7,000 at Devonport Oval

Jubilee Shield (Saturday, 21 June 1947)
TANFL 17.13 (115) v NTFA 14.19 (103) – Att: 10,000 at North Hobart Oval

Jubilee Shield (Saturday, 12 July 1947)
TANFL 15.9 (99) v NTFA 14.10 (94) – Att: 10,000 at York Park

Interstate Matches
 See: 1947 Australian National Football Carnival

Leading Goalkickers: TANFL
Lance Collins (Sandy Bay) – 50

Medal Winners
Jack Sullivan (Hobart) – William Leitch Medal
Neil Clarke (Sandy Bay) – George Watt Medal (Reserves)
Alan Hughes (Macalburn) – V.A Geard Medal (Under-19's)

1947 TANFL Ladder

Round 1
(Saturday, 19 April 1947)
New Town 12.18 (90) v Nth Hobart 7.13 (55) – Att: 4,574 at North Hobart Oval
Sandy Bay 14.14 (98) v Hobart 8.17 (65) – Att: 3,142 at Queenborough Oval
Clarence 16.15 (111) v New Norfolk 9.13 (67) – Att: 834 at Bellerive Oval *
Note: Clarence Football Club's maiden TANFL victory, also first TANFL match at Bellerive Oval.

Round 2
(Saturday, 26 April 1947)
Nth Hobart 17.14 (116) v Sandy Bay 14.11 (95) – Att: 5,446 at North Hobart Oval
Hobart 13.18 (96) v Clarence 14.8 (92) – Att: 2,006 at TCA Ground
New Town 16.19 (115) v New Norfolk 7.14 (56) – Att: 1,456 at Boyer Oval *
Note: First TANFL match staged at Boyer Oval (built by ANM Limited in 1945).

Round 3
(Saturday, 3 May 1947)
New Town 12.19 (91) v Sandy Bay 12.12 (84) – Att: 6,160 at North Hobart Oval
Hobart 9.13 (67) v New Norfolk 9.7 (61) – Att: 1,085 at TCA Ground
Nth Hobart 9.18 (72) v Clarence 1.7 (13) – Att: 1,592 at Bellerive Oval

Round 4
(Saturday, 17 May 1947)
Hobart 6.21 (57) v New Town 6.9 (45)  – Att: 3,165 at North Hobart Oval
Sandy Bay 7.9 (51) v Clarence 5.18 (48)  – Att: 1,609 at Queenborough Oval
Nth Hobart 6.18 (54) v New Norfolk 4.11 (35)  – Att: 1,100 at Boyer Oval

Round 5
(Saturday, 24 May 1947)
Nth Hobart 12.13 (85) v Hobart 11.8 (74) – Att: 5,705 at North Hobart Oval
New Town 14.14 (98) v Clarence 11.17 (83) – Att: 1,490 at Bellerive Oval
Sandy Bay 15.20 (110) v New Norfolk 10.15 (75) – Att: 1,555 at Queenborough Oval

Round 6
(Saturday, 31 May 1947)
New Town 14.15 (99) v Nth Hobart 14.14 (98) – Att: 5,755 at North Hobart Oval
Hobart 17.14 (116) v Sandy Bay 14.10 (94) – Att: 2,727 at TCA Ground
Clarence 13.7 (85) v New Norfolk 8.7 (55) – Att: 2,400 at Boyer Oval

Round 7
(Saturday, 14 June 1947)
New Town 13.19 (97) v New Norfolk 10.10 (70) – Att: 2,462 at North Hobart Oval
Nth Hobart 14.11 (95) v Sandy Bay 12.16 (88) – Att: 3,179 at Queenborough Oval
Hobart 18.15 (123) v Clarence 10.16 (76) – Att: 1,847 at Bellerive Oval

Round 8
(Monday, 16 June 1947)
Nth Hobart 6.9 (45) v Clarence 3.13 (31) – Att: 1,644 at North Hobart Oval
Sandy Bay 10.11 (71) v New Town 8.15 (63) – Att: 1,330 at Queenborough Oval
Hobart 7.6 (48) v New Norfolk 2.8 (20) – Att: 500 at Boyer Oval

Round 9
(Saturday, 28 June 1947)
Hobart 11.12 (78) v New Town 8.11 (59) – Att: 3,575 at TCA Ground
Nth Hobart 10.12 (72) v New Norfolk 7.6 (48) – Att: 817 at Queenborough Oval
Sandy Bay 21.23 (149) v Clarence 12.14 (86) – Att: 1,652 at Bellerive Oval

Round 10
(Saturday, 5 July 1947)
Nth Hobart 10.10 (70) v Hobart 7.9 (51) – Att: 5,675 at TCA Ground
New Town 10.17 (77) v Clarence 11.6 (72) – Att: 1,076 at Queenborough Oval
Sandy Bay 14.7 (91) v New Norfolk 7.14 (56) – Att: 1,039 at Boyer Oval

Round 11
(Saturday, 19 July 1947)
New Town 10.11 (71) v Nth Hobart 7.13 (55) – Att: 3,400 at TCA Ground
Hobart 9.16 (70) v Sandy Bay 5.16 (46) – Att: 3,283 at Queenborough Oval
New Norfolk 15.10 (100) v Clarence 9.13 (67) – Att: 851 at Bellerive Oval *
Note: New Norfolk District Football Club's maiden TANFL victory.

Round 12
(Saturday, 26 July 1947)
Hobart 15.24 (114) v Clarence 8.7 (55) – Att: 1,596 at TCA Ground
Sandy Bay 15.18 (108) v Nth Hobart 8.13 (61) – Att: 4,224 at Queenborough Oval
New Town 10.12 (72) v New Norfolk 5.9 (39) – Att: 1,550 at Boyer Oval

Round 13
(Saturday, 16 August 1947)
Sandy Bay 10.14 (74) v New Town 7.9 (51) – Att: 3,731 at TCA Ground
Hobart 14.20 (104) v New Norfolk 8.4 (52) – Att: 884 at Queenborough Oval
Nth Hobart 14.13 (97) v Clarence 10.15 (75) – Att: 800 at Bellerive Oval

Round 14
(Saturday, 23 August 1947)
Hobart 10.9 (69) v New Town 7.9 (51) – Att: 4,339 at North Hobart Oval
Sandy Bay 15.20 (110) v Clarence 9.13 (67) – Att: 1,570 at Queenborough Oval
Nth Hobart 17.22 (124) v New Norfolk 5.3 (33) – Att: 1,030 at Boyer Oval

Round 15
(Saturday, 30 August 1947)
Nth Hobart 10.21 (81) v Hobart 7.13 (55) – Att: 4,186 at North Hobart Oval
Sandy Bay 23.14 (152) v New Norfolk 9.17 (71) – Att: 700 at Queenborough Oval
Clarence 8.19 (67) v New Town 7.11 (53) – Att: 890 at Bellerive Oval

First Semi Final
(Saturday, 6 September 1947)
New Town: 5.6 (36) | 9.10 (64) | 9.12 (66) | 13.16 (94)
Sandy Bay: 1.1 (7) | 2.3 (15) | 5.5 (35) | 8.8 (56)
Attendance: 6,630 at North Hobart Oval

Second Semi Final
(Saturday, 13 September 1947)
Hobart: 2.2 (14) | 4.6 (30) | 6.10 (46) | 7.16 (58)
Nth Hobart: 3.6 (24) | 3.6 (24) | 5.7 (37) | 7.8 (50)
Attendance: 7,846 at North Hobart Oval

Preliminary Final
(Saturday, 20 September 1947)
Nth Hobart: 1.1 (7) | 5.4 (34) | 11.10 (76) | 12.11 (83)
New Town: 2.6 (18) | 4.7 (31) | 5.8 (38) | 9.10 (64)
Attendance: 8,789 at North Hobart Oval

Grand Final
(Saturday, 27 September 1947)
Nth Hobart: 2.0 (12) | 3.3 (21) | 8.5 (53) | 13.7 (85)
Hobart: 2.4 (16) | 4.5 (29) | 8.8 (56) | 10.9 (69)
Attendance: 11,396 at North Hobart Oval

Source: All scores and statistics courtesy of the Hobart Mercury publications.

Tasmanian Football League seasons